Goff LJ may refer to:

 Sir Reginald Goff, known judicially as Goff LJ whilst on the Court of Appeal

 Robert Goff, Baron Goff of Chieveley, known judicially as Robert Goff LJ whilst on the Court of Appeal